Sheffield Wednesday  F.C., often abbreviated to SWLFC and nicknamed The Owls, are a women's and girls football club based in South Yorkshire, England. They play home games at Sheffield Hallam University Sports park, Bawtry road, Sheffield S9 1UA and the First team play their games currently in the North East Regional League and are affiliated to the professional men's club Sheffield Wednesday F.C. They also have a 2nd Reserve team and a 3rd senior Development team that play currently in the Sheffield & Hallamshire Women's County League. The 10 teams that make up the junior section all play within the Sheffield & Hallamshire Girl's County League (SHGCL).

History
The team, originally called Star Ladies, were formed at the Star Inn Public House in Rotherham in 1971 following a charity match between men and women at the pub. Shortly afterwards the side joined the Sheffield Ladies League. When this league was disbanded they joined the Nottinghamshire Ladies League which was later renamed the East Midlands Ladies League.

They took the name Sheffield Wednesday Ladies in 1985 and when the Women's Football Association (WFA) created the Women's Premier League in 1991 Sheffield Wednesday Ladies became founder members, continuing in this league until 2005 when they were relegated into the Northern Combination Women's Football League for two seasons. Christine McCann guided the Owls back to the top flight as champions of the Northern Combination in 2007. McCann handed the reins to senior coach Daniel Duke for their Premier League return and he and his staff guided them to a 6th-place finish. Due to committee changes it was decided for the 2009–10 season that the team would separate from the junior section and take the name Sheffield Wednesday  F.C.

On 26 September 2009 Daniel Duke resigned as Head Coach due to the Owls' poor start to the season. He was replaced by Luton Town footballer Andy Burgess, who installed Liam Kelly has his assistant. Kelly left after two weeks, citing work commitments.

Burgess then resigned in early 2010 and was replaced by his former assistant. Under Liam Kelly the club finished 11th in the 2009-10 Premier League Northern Division, in the second relegation place. Kelly left at the end of the season.

SWLFC were relegated at the end of the season, mainly due to bad results and team changes forced upon them by the constant managerial roundabout. Chairman Jeff Maslin decided the club needed stability to give SWLFC a better chance of promotion straight back to the FAPWL. Adam Smallman was appointed in the pre-season and started rebuilding the squad. Some departures and some arrivals has heralded a new look squad.

After the 2011–12 season due to financial constraints the club folded and The Junior section of Sheffield Wednesday Ladies took over the Women's mantle continuing with the original Ladies name and currently occupying a position for 2015/16 in the North East regional Women's League after being promoted in 2nd place from the SHWCFL and prior to that as champions of the SHWCFL Division Two in their first season of adult football. They also now have a Reserve and a Development team that play in the Sheffield and Hallamshire First division.

Notable former players

  Sarah Begg
  Vicky Exley
  Melanie Garside-Wight
  Leanne Hall
  Jo Potter
  Lesley Sands

Honours

Records
Record Win: 26–1 v Fishtoft, East Midlands Ladies League, 1981

Record Defeat: 0–22 v Doncaster Belles, FA Women's Cup, 1979

References

Official website

External links

Association football clubs established in 1971
Women's football clubs in England
Ladies
1971 establishments in England
FA Women's National League teams
Sheffield & Hallamshire County FA members